Rouen Métropole Basket, shortly named RMB, is a professional basketball club founded in 2011,  based in Rouen, France. The team currently plays in the LNB Pro B, the French second division.

History
After playing in the Pro B for one year, the club received a wild card for the 2014–15 Pro A season. The team was relegated back to Pro B after the 2015–16 Pro A season.

Season by season

Notable players
To appear in this section a player must have either:
- Set a club record or won an individual award as a professional player.
- Played at least one official international match for his senior national team.

References

External links
 Official team website 

Basketball teams in France
Sport in Rouen